Nikon Instruments is a division of the Nikon Corporation, which is headquartered in Tokyo. Its US operations are based in Melville, New York and its European operations in Amstelveen, Netherlands. Nikon Instruments is a specialist in optical instrumentation and the only microscope company to manufacture its own glass.

History
The company, Nippon Kogaku KK ('Japan Optics'), was formed in 1917 with the merger of three Japanese optical manufacturers to produce precision optical glass. In 1925, the brand expanded to produce the first microscope with a revolving nosepiece and interchangeable objectives – the Joico microscope. Over the next few decades the microscopy division introduced new polarising and stereomicroscopes, and metrology products for measuring and inspection.
 
Nikon launched the Optiphot and Labophot microscopes in the 1970s and established the CF Optical system. In the 1980s, they released 80 new products, including the inverted Diaphot microscope, which was used in IVF techniques. The introduction of the Eclipse range of infinity optics in the 1990s was a departure from traditional microscope design. CFI60 optics have high numerical apertures (N.A.s) and long working distances, increased resolution and light-gathering capability and high performance in confocal imaging. The infinity optical system also has the benefit that the distance between the objective and the eyepiece tube is not fixed, allowing a variety of imaging modules to be inserted into the light path without any compromise in optical quality.  This has allowed microscopes to be used as versatile imaging workstations that provide users with instant access to several imaging methods. Using a Nikon Diaphot microscope, in 1996, Dolly the sheep was the first mammal to be successfully cloned from an adult cell. Nikon has introduced a series of digital camera systems optimized for microscopy-based applications enabling the digital transfer of images.

Products
Alongside developments in inter-disciplinary, clinical and confocal microscope solutions, Nikon's digital imaging technologies and software solutions support all microscopy and imaging functions, image management and analysis. The Eclipse Ti series of inverted microscopes allow the simultaneous mounting of confocal, TIRF module and multiple stacked epi-fluorescence filter turrets to make this microscope function as a live cell imaging platform.  Long term timelapse imaging of living cells is possible in the BioStation series. Nikon partnered with OptraSCAN for accelerating adoption of digital pathology systems and solutions in North America.

Nikon's N-SIM microscopy system can produce two times conventional resolution by combining Structured Illumination Microscopy technology licensed from UCSF based on Nikon's Eclipse Ti research inverted microscope. N-STORM is a new super-resolution microscope system that combines “Stochastic Optical Reconstruction Microscopy” technology (licensed from Harvard University) and Nikon's Eclipse Ti, providing resolution that is 10 times greater than that of conventional optical microscopes.

References 

Lab Technologist - Company Profile
N-STORM Licensed from Harvard University
N-SIM licensed by USCF
Microscopy News
Nikon associates with OptraSCAN for digital pathology adoption

Nikon